The 2023 United Cup was the first edition of the United Cup, an international outdoor hard court mixed-gender team tennis tournament held by the Association of Tennis Professionals (ATP) and the Women's Tennis Association (WTA). Serving as the opener for the 2023 ATP Tour and the 2023 WTA Tour, it was held from 29 December 2022 to 8 January 2023 at three venues in the Australian cities of Brisbane, Perth, and Sydney. It was also the first mixed-gender team event to offer both ATP rankings and WTA rankings points to its players: a player was able to win a maximum of 500 points.

The United States won the event, defeating Italy in the finals, 4–0. The United States swept Poland in the semifinals while Italy lost one match in their defeat of Greece.

Finals

Format 
Each city hosted two groups of three countries in a round robin format in the first week of the tournament. The round-robin format consisted of two men's and two women's singles matches, and one mixed doubles match. There was one men's singles and one women's singles match in each session, with the mixed doubles match taking place in the evening session.

The group winners in each host city played off for one of three semi-final spots with the highest ranked host city playoff loser, taking into account all ties, becoming the fourth semi-finalist.

There was a travel day allocated before the semi-finals and final take place in Sydney.

Qualification 
18 countries qualified as follows:
 Six countries qualified based on the ATP ranking of their number one ranked singles player.
 Six countries qualified based on the WTA ranking of their number one ranked singles player.
 The final six countries qualified based on the combined ranking of their number one ranked ATP and WTA players.

In exchange for being the host nation, Australia was guaranteed one of the spots reserved for teams with the best combined ranking if it would had failed to qualify on its own.

Teams featured three or four players from each tour.

Venues 
Brisbane, Perth and Sydney each hosted two groups of three countries in a round robin format and the host city finals in the first seven days of the tournament. Sydney hosted the semifinals and the final on the last four days of the tournament.

ATP / WTA ranking points

Entrants 
The main doubles and their alternates were announced on 9 November 2022.

Withdrawals
  Nick Kyrgios (No. 22)
  Diego Schwartzman (No. 25)
  Kamil Majchrzak (No. 82)

Group stage 
The 18 teams were divided into six groups of three teams each in a round-robin format. The winners of each group qualified for the host city finals.

Overview 
T = Ties, M = Matches, S = Sets

Group A 
Host city: Perth

Greece vs. Bulgaria

Belgium vs. Bulgaria

Greece vs. Belgium

Group B 
Host city: Brisbane

Switzerland vs. Kazakhstan

Poland vs. Kazakhstan

Poland vs. Switzerland

Group C 
Host city: Sydney

United States vs. Czech Republic

Germany vs. Czech Republic

United States vs. Germany

Group D 
Host city: Sydney

Australia vs. Great Britain

Spain vs. Great Britain

Spain vs. Australia

Group E 
Host city: Brisbane

Italy vs. Brazil

Brazil vs. Norway

Italy vs. Norway

Group F 
Host city: Perth

France vs. Argentina

Croatia vs. Argentina

France vs. Croatia

Knockout stage

Host city finals 

 The three winners advanced to the semifinals along with a losing host city finalist with the best record from its three ties.

Ranking of teams losing in the host city finals

Greece vs. Croatia

Poland vs. Italy

United States vs. Great Britain

Bracket

Semifinals

Poland  vs. United States

Greece vs. Italy

Final

United States vs. Italy

See also 
 Hopman Cup
 ATP Cup

References

External links 
 Official website
Draw

2023 ATP Tour
2023 WTA Tour
2023 in Australian tennis
December 2022 sports events in Australia
January 2023 sports events in Australia
Mixed doubles tennis